The 3rd IPC Ice Sledge Hockey World Championships was held between April 13, 2004 and April 24, 2004 at Kempehallen in Örnsköldsvik, Sweden. Örnsköldsvik was also the host of the first Paralympic Winter Games in 1976. Participating countries: 104 athletes from eight nations Canada, Estonia, Germany, Great Britain, Japan, Norway, Sweden, United States. The USA, Norway and Sweden were automatically qualified for their performance at the Salt Lake 2002 Paralympic Winter Games, while the other five teams were selected through regional championships.

Final rankings
( Rosters are not yet complete )

7th  ( Gerd Bleidorn, Marius Hattendorf, Sebastian Kessler, Robert Pabst, Raimund Patzelt, Udo Segreff, Head coach: Michael Gursinsky, Coach: Wolfgang Kempe )
8th  ( Valeri Falkenberg, Vladimir Karandašev, Ivar Liiv, Andrei Sokolov, Vladimir Savolainen, Sergei Vesselov, Kaido Kalm C, Aleksander Jarlõkov, Arvi Piirioja, Imre Tiitsu, Tarmo Eerma, Maksim Vedernikov, Jüri Tammleht, Head coach: Nikolai Lopassov, Coach: Olle Sildre )

Preliminary round

Group A

Schedule
All times are local (UTC+2)

Group B

Schedule
All times are local (UTC+2)

Final round

5th to 8th Place Playoff

Semifinals

7th Place Playoff

5th Place Playoff

Bronze Medal Game

Gold Medal Game

See also
 Ice sledge hockey
 Ice hockey#Sledge hockey
 Ice sledge hockey at the 2006 Winter Paralympics
 2008 IPC Ice Sledge Hockey World Championships
 1976 First winter Paralympics in Örnsköldsvik, Sweden

External links
 Official Results
 Paralympic.org Press Releases - IPC Ice Sledge Hockey World Championships Take to the Ice
 Norway Victorious in Ice Sledge Hockey World Champs

IPC Ice Sledge Hockey World Championships
World Para Ice Hockey Championships
International ice hockey competitions hosted by Sweden
World
Sports competitions in Örnsköldsvik
April 2004 sports events in Europe